Woking is a constituency represented in the House of Commons of the UK Parliament since 2010 by Jonathan Lord, a Conservative. Since it was first created for the 1950 general election, it has only ever returned Conservative Party candidates.

Constituency profile
The seat includes all of Woking Borough plus the two Guildford Borough villages of Pirbright and Normandy. There is an Armed Forces presence at Pirbright Camp and the Ash Ranges. Voters are wealthier than the UK average.

History
It was created in 1950 from the county constituencies of Chertsey and lightly populated parts of Farnham.

With exceptions in 1974 (February election), 1997, 2005 and 2010, when the majority was less, Woking has returned a Conservative candidate whose majority has exceeded 15% of the votes cast. At both the 2015 and 2017 general elections, the Labour candidates polled in second place. In 2019, the Lib Dems moved into second place. During the history of the constituency since it was formed in 1950, the Labour Party has been the runner-up in ten general elections and the Liberals/Lib Dems have also been runners-up ten times. Jonathan Lord has been the MP for the constituency since 2010. The narrowest margin of victory was 11.2% of the vote, in 1997, its most marginal result. By contrast, at the 2015 general election the seat was the 41st-safest of the Conservative Party's 331 seats by percentage of majority, with the Conservatives fully 40 percentage points ahead of Labour.

The Liberal Democrats currently have a small majority on Woking Borough Council and there is one Labour-voting ward (Canalside), but historically the Conservatives have been the dominant force on Woking Borough Council. The Conservatives have also consistently won both of the Guildford Borough Council wards of Pirbright and Normandy over many election cycles.

Boundaries

 1950–74: The Urban Districts of Frimley and Camberley, and Woking, and in the Rural District of Guildford the parishes of Ash, Normandy, and Pirbright.
 1974–83: as above less Frimley and Camberley.  Note in 1974 the areas became parts of Woking (borough) and Guildford (borough).
 1983–97: unchanged (i.e. The Borough of Woking, and the Borough of Guildford wards of Ash, Ash Vale, Normandy, and Pirbright.)
 1997–present: as above less Ash and Ash Vale

The 1974-recipient seat of Frimley and Camberley was North West Surrey (abolished in 1997).  The 1997-recipient of Ash and Ash Vale was Surrey Heath. The constituency is based around the town of Woking in Surrey. The Boundary Commission for England made no boundary changes for Woking in the review before the 2010 general election. However, the current boundary review may result in the loss of Pirbright and Normandy wards to the constituency of Surrey Heath.

Members of Parliament

Elections

Elections in the 2010s

Elections in the 2000s

Elections in the 1990s

This constituency underwent boundary changes between the 1992 and 1997 general elections and thus change in share of vote is based on a notional calculation.

Elections in the 1980s

Elections in the 1970s

Elections in the 1960s

Elections in the 1950s

See also
List of parliamentary constituencies in Surrey

Notes

References

Sources
 
 
 
 
 
 
 

Parliamentary constituencies in South East England
Constituencies of the Parliament of the United Kingdom established in 1950
Woking
Politics of Surrey